The men's 200 metre individual medley competition of the swimming events at the 1999 Pan American Games took place on 7 August at the Pan Am Pool. The last Pan American Games champion was Curtis Myden of Canada.

This race consisted of four lengths of the pool, one each in backstroke, breaststroke, butterfly and freestyle swimming.

Results
All times are in minutes and seconds.

Heats
The first round was held on August 7.

B Final 
The B final was held on August 7.

A Final 
The A final was held on August 7.

References

Swimming at the 1999 Pan American Games